Kirstine Stubbe Teglbjærg is a Danish composer, singer, and producer. June 2021 she launched her new solo project Sitrekin. She is well known for having been the lead singer and songwriter for Blue Foundation. Co-founder and co-CEO of HUN SOLO. Based in Copenhagen.

Career
She was the lead singer for Blue Foundation until 2009 and was nominated for several awards for her work in this band.

Since her departure, she has been making music underground. She worked in her own studio Copenhagen until the release of her first solo album in 2012. She wanted to find her very own and unique sound.

Discography

Blue Foundation
Albums
2001: Blue Foundation (April Records)
2004: Sweep of Days (Virgin/EMI)
2006: Solid Origami – Blue Foundation Collected and Re-worked (Only Japan, Popgroup)
2007: Life of a Ghost (Virgin/EMI)

Singles
1999: Hide/Hollywood (MoshiMoshi)
2000: Wise Guy/Hollywood. Inclusive remixes by The Prunes, Future 3 and Pelding (April Records)
2003: As I moved on. Inclusive remixes by Run Jeremy Band and Bichi  (Virgin/EMI)
2004: End of the day (Virgin/EMI)
2005: Embers (Jack to Phono)
2005: This is goodbye (Virgin/EMI)
2006: Crosshair (Virgin/EMI)
2006: Sweep – Mikkel Metal, 16 Bit Lolitas, Jim Rivers Remixes (Okyo/Renaissance)
2007: Enemy (Virgin/EMI)
2009: Eyes On Fire (Astralwerks USA)
2009: Watch you sleeping Featuring Mark Kozelek – Sun kil Moon (Dead Peoples Choice)

Solo work
Album
2013: Hamskifte (A:larm/Universal)

EP
2013: Hamskifte Remixes (A:larm/Universal)

Singles
2012: Drømmenes Lyd (A:larm/Universal)
2013: Tæppet er faldet (A:larm/Universal)

Collaboration
2020: Rapture (Beau featuring Kirstine Stubbe Teglbjærg)

2014: Never be apart (Bottled in England featuring Kirstine Stubbe Teglbjærg)
2015: Runnin’ (Bogan Via featuring Kirstine Stubbe Teglbjærg)

Modern Dance
She has composed music for theatre and modern dance performances.

2018: Charles. Nørregaards Teater Odense.

2015: Men Nu Har Jeg En Hjærne. Det menneskelige Teater/KBH’s Musikteater.
2014: Alting Mødes. Det Flydende Teater
2012: Blackout! (MUTE Comp. Physical Theatre)
2009: Når jeg forsvinder under mig. (JacoBole Teatret/CampX)
2004: Baby/Baby (Copenhagen Performance House)
2003: SnapShots (Nyt Dansk Danseteater)
2003: Hendrix House: (Tim Feldmann/Wilda Dance)

Awards

|-
| 2005
| Sweep of Days
| Danish Music Awards: Best Urban Album of the year
| 
|-
| 2005
| Blue Foundation
| Danish Music Awards: Best Act of the year
| 
|-
| 2005
| Kirstine Stubbe Teglbjærg
| Danish Music Awards: Female singer of the year
| 
|-
| 2005
| Blue Foundation
| Steppeulven (The critics prize): Band of the year
| 
|-
| 2005
| Blue Foundation
| Steppeulven (The critics prize): Best live act of the year
| 
|-
| 2006
| Blue Foundation's "This is Goodbye" (From the film Drabet)
| Robert Awards: Song of the year
| 
|}

References

1975 births
Living people
Danish women singers